Krzysztof Paterka (born 19 August 1986) is a retired Polish Paralympic swimmer who specialises in the breaststroke and competed in international elite competitions. He is a Paralympic bronze medalist, three-time World bronze medalist and a European silver medalist. He was born without his left forearm and was diagnosed with temporal lobe epilepsy as a young child.

References

1986 births
Living people
Sportspeople from Poznań
Paralympic swimmers of Poland
Polish male breaststroke swimmers
Swimmers at the 2004 Summer Paralympics
Swimmers at the 2008 Summer Paralympics
Swimmers at the 2012 Summer Paralympics
Medalists at the 2004 Summer Paralympics
Medalists at the World Para Swimming Championships
Medalists at the World Para Swimming European Championships
People with epilepsy
S9-classified Paralympic swimmers